Corry Kawilarang (born 1935)  is a former Indonesian badminton player from the 1960s.

Profile
She and Happy Herowati won the women's doubles gold medal at the first 1962 Asian Badminton Championships in Kuala Lumpur, Malaysia   and she also won a bronze medal in mixed doubles with Kho Han Tjiang. In the 1962 Asian Games, she won a silver medal in the women's singles and women's doubles after losing to other Indonesian players and she also managed to win a gold medal in the women's team at the Badminton at the 1962 Asian Games.

Achievements

Asian Games 

Women's singles

Women's doubles

Asian Championships 

Women's doubles 

Mixed doubles

References 

1935 births
Living people
Asian Games medalists in badminton
Badminton players at the 1962 Asian Games
Asian Games silver medalists for Indonesia
Medalists at the 1962 Asian Games
20th-century Indonesian women
21st-century Indonesian women